Herpetogramma phthorosticta is a moth in the family Crambidae. It was described by Edward Meyrick in 1929. It is found on the Marquesas Archipelago in French Polynesia.

References

Moths described in 1929
Herpetogramma
Moths of Oceania